Raymond is an unincorporated community in Coweta County, in the U.S. state of Georgia.

History
A post office called Raymond was established in 1907, and remained in operation until 1980. The community was named after Mary Ray, the mother of its founder.

References

Unincorporated communities in Coweta County, Georgia
Unincorporated communities in Georgia (U.S. state)